LBM may refer to:

 Laboratory of biomechanics of Arts et Métiers ParisTech
 Interleaved Bitmap Format filename extension
 Lattice Boltzmann methods in fluid dynamics
 Pound (mass), lbm or lbm
 Lean body mass
 Location-based media
 London Borough of Merton, UK
 Laser beam machining
 Logical Business Machines, a defunct computer company
 Little Brown Mushroom, a publishing house founded by Alec Soth
 Live bivalve mollusc
 Lumber and Building Materials